Dasychira vagans, the variable tussock moth, is a moth of the family Erebidae. It is found in North America, where it has been recorded from Newfoundland to southern British Columbia in the north and North Carolina and Utah in the west. The habitat consists of forests, including coastal rainforests, high elevation mixed hardwood-conifer forests, oak woodlands and mixed hardwood forests. The species was first described by William Barnes and James Halliday McDunnough in 1913.

The length of the forewings is 14–18 mm for males and 22–24 mm for females. The ground colour of the forewings is blue grey, with fine black scales. The costal part of the median area is usually whitish grey and the antemedial and postmedial lines are dark grey. The hindwings are grey in males and lighter grey to brown grey in females. Adults are on wing from June to August in one generation per year.

The larvae feed on a wide range of plants from Aceraceae, Betulaceae, Fagaceae, Salicaceae and Rosaceae, but favors Quercus species.

Subspecies
Dasychira vagans vagans (eastern Canada, north-eastern United States)
Dasychira vagans grisea (Barnes & McDunnough, 1913) (from southern Manitoba to South Dakota and then to British Columbia and Oregon)

References

Lymantriinae
Moths described in 1913